Reema Worah is an Indian film and television actress. She played the role of Vaidehi in Colors TV's show Na Aana Is Des Laado. She appeared in Life OK's TV show Do Dil Ek Jaan. She appeared in Bharat Ka Veer Putra – Maharana Pratap as Gauhar Jaan. She also played the role of Yamraj's wife Jigna in TV serial Yam Kisi Se Kam Nahin

Filmography
Television
 2000 - 2004 Shaka Laka Boom Boom as Sanjana
 2006 - 2008 Ssshhhh...Koi Hai 
 2008 - 2009 Saath Saath Banayenge Ek Aashiyaan as Lajwanti Uday Singh
 2009 - 2010 Na Aana Is Des Laado as Vaidehi Singh
 2013 Do Dil Ek Jaan
 2014 Bharat Ka Veer Putra – Maharana Pratap as Gauhar Jaan
 2014 Yam Kisi Se Kam Nahin as Jigna
 2017 -  Crime Patrol
 2018 - Mariam Khan - Reporting Live
 2018 - 2019 Vish Ya Amrit: Sitara as Yamini Arjun Singh 
 2020 -Nazar 2 as Hema Singh Chaudhary
 2020 -Ek Duje Ke Vaaste 2 as Anjali Vijay Tiwari
 2020 -  Kasautii Zindagii Kay as Priyanka
 2021 - Shaurya Aur Anokhi Ki Kahani as Kanchan Sabherwal
 2022  - Naagin 6 as Radha Gujral
 2022  - Shubh Laabh - Aapkey Ghar Mein as Maya Toshniwal
 2022  - Dil Diyaan Gallaan as Dr. Aastha Mandeep Brar

Films
2013 - Mazhai Varapoguthu
2012 - Manjunatha BA LLB
2011 - Murali Meets Meera
2010 - Shourya
2010 - Gubbi
2009 - Chal chalein
2008 - Bhago KK Aaya

References

External links

Indian television actresses
Living people
Year of birth missing (living people)
Place of birth missing (living people)
Actresses from Mumbai